Ranmaru may refer to:

Mori Ranmaru (森 蘭丸, 1565–1582), attendant in the service of Oda Nobunaga
Ranmaru Morii, one of the leading characters of The Wallflower manga
 Ranmaru Shindo, one of the leading characters of the Tokko manga

Japanese masculine given names